Cecilia Castro Burgos (born 21 June 1997) is a Spanish taekwondo practitioner. She won one of the bronze medals in the women's welterweight event at the 2022 World Taekwondo Championships held in Guadalajara, Mexico. She won the gold medal in her event at the 2022 European Taekwondo Championships held in Manchester, United Kingdom.

She represented Spain at the 2022 Mediterranean Games held in Oran, Algeria. She won the silver medal in the women's 67kg event. She also represented Spain at the 2018 Mediterranean Games held in Tarragona, Spain.

References

External links 
 

Living people
1997 births
Place of birth missing (living people)
Spanish female taekwondo practitioners
World Taekwondo Championships medalists
European Taekwondo Championships medalists
Competitors at the 2018 Mediterranean Games
Competitors at the 2022 Mediterranean Games
Mediterranean Games silver medalists for Spain
Mediterranean Games medalists in taekwondo
21st-century Spanish women